The 1994 Asian Open was a women's tennis tournament played on indoor carpet courts at the Amagasaki Memorial Sports Centre in Osaka in Japan that was part of Tier III of the 1994 WTA Tour. The tournament was held from February 8 through February 13, 1994. First-seeded Manuela Maleeva-Fragniere won the singles title.

Finals

Singles

 Manuela Maleeva-Fragniere defeated  Iva Majoli 6–1, 4–6, 7–5
 It was Maleeva-Fragniere's only title of the year and the 24th of her career.

Doubles

 Larisa Neiland /  Rennae Stubbs defeated  Pam Shriver /  Elizabeth Smylie 6–4, 6–7, 7–5
 It was Neiland's 2nd title of the year and the 47th of her career. It was Stubbs' 1st title of the year and the 7th of her career.

External links
 ITF tournament edition details

Asian Open
Asian Open (tennis)
Asian Open
Asian Open
Asian Open